The University of Texas at Arlington (UTA) inherited a theme, including a nickname and mascot, of "Rebels" from its days as Arlington State College (ASC). The theme dated back to 1951, but after the integration of the school in 1962 and its admission into the University of Texas System (UT System) in 1965, The Shorthorn student newspaper editorialized that it should be changed. Throughout the 1960s, editorials were written, protests were made, and referendums were held on the Rebel theme. However, with university president Frank Harrison consistently putting the decision fully in the control of UTA students, the student body repeatedly voted against changing the theme.

In 1969–70, a referendum on a replacement theme selected "Mavericks", but it did not defeat "Rebels" in a referendum to change the theme in March 1970. Ultimately, the UT System Board of Regents grew tired of the controversy and voted to abolish UTA's Rebel theme by a vote of seven to two in January 1971. After multiple votes and runoffs, the UTA student body finally selected "Mavericks" as the university's new theme in April 1971.

Background 

The University of Texas at Arlington (UTA) inherited a theme, including a nickname and mascot, of "Rebels" from its days as Arlington State College (ASC). ASC had been the Rebels since a fall 1951 assembly at which students voted for it over "Cadets". The Rebel theme replaced "Blue Riders", which had been adopted in 1949 and perceived by ASC president Ernest H. Hereford as lackluster. The Rebel theme also included more tangential elements, such as the use of the Confederate flag and the playing of "Dixie" as the college's unofficial fight song. In the 1960s, ASC had a mascot named "Johnny Reb", who was elected by the student body alongside a "Miss Dixie Bell". The students also selected a "Mr. and Mrs. Rebel Spirit" each year. ASC had additionally named rooms in its student center after Confederate leaders such as Robert E. Lee and J. E. B. Stuart, while homecoming was observed as "Old South Week" and  included mock slave auctions.

Early debate over the Rebel theme to the first referendum (1962–68) 
The Shorthorn student newspaper first editorialized that the Rebel theme should be changed after the integration of the school in 1962, and then made the same case after its admission into the University of Texas System (UT System) in 1965. In May 1965, the ASC student government held a referendum that resulted in 2,429 votes to keep the "Rebels" theme and only 448 to change. In response to the result, African American students organized a peaceful protest of the university's use of the Confederate flag in October 1965. In fall 1967, African American student Frank Wyman published an essay in the Arlington Review arguing that the same symbol could be viewed very differently by different groups, noting that the Confederate flag symbolized independence and states' rights for some white students while it also represented slavery and racism for African Americans. In spring 1968, The Shorthorn again editorialized that the Rebel theme should be changed, while 70 African American students petitioned ASC's student government to act for change.

In April 1968, the Student Congress voted to remove the university's Confederate flag, which previously had flown over the student center, by July 1, 1968. This decision was unpopular with a majority of the student body, however, and supporters of the Rebel theme conducted a petition drive that garnered 4,000 signatures and a promise from university president Jack Woolf that only a student referendum could change the university's theme. On November 25, 1968, Shorthorn student editor Donna Darovich editorialized, "What happened 104 years ago is neither the fault nor the responsibility of the students at UT Arlington, and when those students wave their flags, prejudice and the Civil War are not what they are upholding. You can't change the past by changing the present." Printed in the same issue of The Shorthorn was a countering editorial by Student Congress president Jeff Hensley, who wrote, "I became convinced the Confederate theme was sufficiently offensive to significant numbers of students to justify removal. The most important consideration is the personal offense which the Confederate theme inflicts on the Negro student." The first referendum on the theme was held in November 1968, resulting in 3,507 votes in favor of keeping the "Rebels" theme and only 952 in favor of changing it. The referendum also saw 36 choices for potential replacement themes, with the top three in votes being Aardvarks, Texans, and Mavericks.

Activism by African American students (1969) 

In spring 1969, the Collegians for Afro-American Progress (CAP) student group went to university president Frank Harrison with a list of demands, including hiring African American professors and establishing an African American studies program alongside changing the Rebel theme. However, Harrison declined or refused to address any of their demands. In October 1969, 17 African American students interrupted a pep rally seeking the removal of the Kappa Alpha fraternity's Confederate flag. The Kappa Alphas refused and a fight broke out. Subsequent activism included the burning of Confederate flags by protestors and an unsuccessful attempt by a group of African American students to enter the press box at a UTA football game in an effort to address the crowd.

Action by administration and additional referendums (1969–70) 
While it publicly expressed support for changing the Rebel theme, the UTA administration and President Harrison consistently put the decision fully in the control of UTA students. The president's Executive Committee, the UTA Faculty Council, and the statewide Texas Intercollegiate Student Association all came out against the Rebel theme. However, multiple votes conducted by the student body failed to abolish the Rebel theme nor did they suggest an alternative. In December 1969, a student vote on an alternate theme finished with 2,330 votes for "Texans", 2,229 for "Mavericks", and 1,199 for "Apollos". Due to the close nature of the vote, a runoff was held in February 1970, turnout was poor as only 318 voted for "Mavericks" and just 174 for "Texans". In March 1970, another referendum pitted "Rebels" against "Mavericks", with a closer result but still victory for the incumbent theme: 2,198 votes for "Rebels" and 1,755 for "Mavericks".

In fall 1970, President Harrison successfully convinced the UTA marching band to stop playing "Dixie" at football games and stop wearing Confederate flags on their uniforms. Later that fall, the board of directors of the UTA Ex-Students Association voted six to five to ask UTA to resume playing "Dixie" as its fight song and fully restore Rebel-themed symbols on campus.

Action by the UT System Board of Regents and resolution (1971) 

Ultimately, the UT System Board of Regents grew tired of the controversy and voted to abolish UTA's Rebel theme by a vote of seven to two in January 1971. In the words of UT System chancellor Charles LeMaistre, the Rebel theme had caused "discord and contention" and "adversely affected the morale" at UTA. The regents then asked President Harrison to hold elections for a new theme as soon as possible and have it in use by June 1, 1971. Harrison was widely criticized for advocating a change in theme before the regents and then enforcing the referendum mandated by the regents, especially after his earlier support of the students deciding the fate of the Rebel theme.

After multiple votes and runoffs, the UTA student body finally selected "Mavericks" as the university's new theme in April 1971. The final referendum in April 1971 ended in a close vote that necessitated a runoff: 460 votes for "Mavericks", 408 for "Toros", 370 for "Rangers", and 361 for "Hawks". In the runoff at the end of the semester, "Mavericks" earned 1,863 votes while "Toros" received 1,431. While "Mavericks" officially became the new nickname and mascot of UTA on June 4, 1971, many supporters of the Rebel theme had hard feelings about the whole experience, some of whom remained opposed to the change and Harrison's actions decades later. Since the adoption of "Mavericks" as UTA's new theme, its mascot and athletics logo have variously featured a horse with cattle horns, a man based loosely on the historical Texas land baron and politician Samuel Maverick, and ultimately a horse without horns.

References

Sources

External links 
 

Rebel theme controversy